Northern Cyprus participated in the Turkvision Song Contest 2013 in Eskişehir, Turkey. Gommalar were selected as the Northern Cypriot artists for the contest, while the song "Havalanıyor" was internally selected at a later date.

Before Turkvision

National final
Northern Cypriot broadcaster Kıbris Genç TV organised a national final to select the Northern Cypriot artist for the contest. Auditions took place on 13 November 2013 in Nicosia, and the national final was held on 20 November 2013.

Song selection
Although Gommalar performed the song "Ayrıntılar" in the national final, they ultimately performed the song "Havalanıyor" at Turkvision.

At Turkvision
The Northern Cypriot juror was Ertan Birinci.

Semi-final
Northern Cyprus performed 16th in the semi-final on 19 December 2013, and qualified for the final.

Final
Northern Cyprus performed 10th in the final on 21 December 2013, placing 10th with 175 points.

References

Countries in the Turkvision Song Contest 2013
2013